Irvin Leigh Matus (July 25, 1941 – January 5, 2011) was an independent scholar, autodidact, and author. He is best known as an authority on Shakespeare, but also wrote about aspects of Brooklyn's history such as the Vitagraph Studios, and developed a method of modelling baseball statistics. He was a scholar-in-residence at Shepherd University for the academic year 1992-1993.  He was based in Washington, DC.

Early life
Matus's father was manager of the Western Union office in Times Square. The late congressman Stephen J. Solarz was his cousin.  Matus was born and raised in Brooklyn, New York, where he lived until 1971. He graduated from Erasmus Hall High School in 1958, and briefly studied commercial art at the Pratt Institute in New York. His primary interests at the time focused on baseball, American history and rhythm and blues, his musical interests being influenced by his early friendship with Alan Freed. Together with his brother Paul he ran an urban transport business until he was drafted in 1965 into United States Army. Stationed on Staten Island, he won the Army Commendation Medal for meritorious service.

Baseball
A keen reader of baseball statistics, in 1978 he published an article anticipating what was later to be known as sabermetric analysis, though Matus would distinguish his own methods from the mechanical computerized techniques of contemporary sabermetrics, an approach he characterizes as "the baseball version of Oxfordianism." The article analysed pitching stats on 162 scorecards for one year, 1976 to examine the view of pitching coaches at the time that 135 pitches (15 per innings) was the average for a complete game. Tom Seaver relied on this standard yardstick in evaluating a pitcher's performance, that he is doing well if he throws about 15 pitches per innings. By a close break-down of statistics, based his analysis on average of 14 pitches per inning after six innings, Matus showed that the contrary was the case, and concluded: "The evidence clearly indicates that, for endurance and effectiveness in any given game, 14 pitches or less per innings as an average is preferable for most pitchers."

At the time of his death, he was working on a comprehensive history of baseball.

Researching Shakespeare
His interest in Shakespeare dated back to high school, though he once confessed that his notion of a good read consisted back then of reading a Brooklyn Dodger box-score sheet. Shakespeare classes tortured him for the impression they gave that Shakespeare wrote footnotes. Yet one day, while walking down Flatbush Avenue, a line—"You blocks, you stones, you worse than senseless things!"—from Julius Caesar floated to mind and seemed to sum up the appearance of the crowd he encountered.  He suddenly realized that, unwittingly, he had been memorizing large swathes of Shakespeare. He became a dedicated Shakespearean shortly afterwards, on watching Richard Burton's performance as Edwin Booth in the film Prince of Players.

Shakespeare, the Living Record
Matus would read the history plays together with biographies of the kings they featured, and discovered, from earlier period tourist brochures, an article by A.L. Rowse and one by Louis Wright, past director of the Folger Shakespeare Library, that the artifacts and physical environment of Shakespeare's life were poorly represented. In 1983, impressed by reading a book on English architecture, he scoured the libraries to find information linking Elizabethan buildings to Shakespeare, only to find that virtually no good reference books had been written. After a brief trip to England for roughly 6 weeks in 1984,  he and his brother Paul sold their home on Long Island,  and Matus used his proceeds to finance his research project on this topic, — which entailed a second 6-month journey in a camper van—to examine buildings on-site and interview archivists, preservationists, and historians. Returning to the United States in November 1985, he moved to Washington to finalize his research by reading in the Folger Library. There Samuel Schoenbaum, the doyen of Shakespearean biographers, assisted him in securing access to its restricted collections.

Almost wholly self-financed, Matus eked out a living by working part-time jobs, while finding accommodation as a house-sitter.  In June, 1987, he received a $2,500 grant that allowed him to buy a $650 word processor and begin his writing. Shakespearean scholar Richard Dutton read his manuscript, and submitted it to Macmillan, remarking that:

It's very thorough, archival, back-to-the-grass-roots, trust-nothing, find-the-first-sources scholarship... And so little scholarship is like that. He's done an amazing job of collecting that sort of information.

In the meantime he published an article, "An Early Reference to the Coventry Corpus Christi Pageants in Shakespeare?" suggesting a possible source for Shakespeare's metaphor, in "The Tragedy of King Richard III", of the "worm of conscience" in the Doomsday play of the Drapers' Guild in 1561.

The resulting book, Shakespeare, the Living Record , published by Palgrave Macmillan in 1991, took the form of a travelogue of modern-day England pertaining to persons and places associated with Shakespeare or mentioned in his plays.  Stanley Wells thought this 'freelance' contribution sounded 'refreshingly up-to-date'.

The Shakespeare authorship question: Shakespeare, In Fact

In February 1989 he was asked by the Shakespeare Authorship Roundtable to investigate the scholarship of the Shakespeare authorship controversy and was invited to speak to the membership in Los Angeles about his findings. Matus, according to Jonathan Bate, came to the controversy as an agnostic. Up until this particular research interest emerged, his interest in Shakespeare had been almost entirely focused on the plays, not their author. He flew to Los Angeles in August 1989 and spent two months there. His visit culminated in an address he delivered to members of the Roundtable in September, in which he remarked that, though he found the members honest, thoughtful, gracious, and cordial, his research found much fault with Oxfordian scholarship and led him to the conclusion that William Shakespeare was the true author of the works.

Matus then turned to write a comprehensive book on the Shakespearean authorship question. He returned to England in 1993 for another five months, primarily to research in the British Library. In Matus's view, the long history of the debate in public controversy and both amateurish and professional speculation had been usually ignored by scholars. He defended his method by arguing for the following principle:

It is the rule of controversialist scholarship, the error rate of which hovers around 100 percent, that a single flaw in a work of orthodox scholarship, whether perceived or actual—or fabricated—is sufficient in their eyes to cast doubt upon the accuracy and authenticity of the entire work.

He took the "Stratfordian" perspective, advocating the orthodox view that William Shakespeare of Stratford-on-Avon, was the primary author of the plays attributed to him.  Matus went on to defend this position against the Oxfordian theory, in the October 1991 issue of The Atlantic Monthly as part of a print debate written by advocates of both sides. He did the same in an article published as part of a similar debate in the April 1999 issue of Harper's Magazine.

In Shakespeare, In Fact, Matus examined Oxfordian arguments, presenting both detailed rebuttals of the sceptical perspective and positive evidence for Shakespeare's authorship. On its publication, Shakespeare scholar Thomas Pendleton hailed the work as the most authoritative on the subject. Writer Scott McCrea has praised it for its "original and valuable scholarship",  while James S. Shapiro has recently referred "those interested in the strongest arguments in favor of Shakespeare’s authorship" to Matus's book. Gail Kern Paster, director of the Washington, DC-based Folger Shakespeare Library, judging its contribution more broadly, has written that Shakespeare, in Fact is recognized as "a reliable, trustworthy, and authoritative source for what we know for sure about Shakespeare." Dover Books reissued  Shakespeare, In Fact in 2013, with a new introduction by Thomas Mann, former reference librarian at the Library of Congress.

While working on Shakespeare, In Fact Matus also investigated a different authorship question: Charles Hamilton's claim that he had found "Cardenio"—a lost play by Shakespeare. The play turned out to be the playhouse copy of Thomas Middleton's "The Second Maiden's Tragedy," and Matus reviewed Hamilton's book for the Times Literary Supplement.

Later years
Matus lived in great dignity on an income substantially under $4,000 per annum in his later years. His brilliant conversation, gentleness with fellows and with the creaturely world, and resolute integrity in the face of hard circumstances, is fondly remembered by those who had the opportunity to know him.

Works

Books

Academic journals

Popular press

Miscellaneous

Notes and references

Notes

References

Sources

External links
Obituary in the Washington Post
The Case for Shakespeare from the Atlantic Monthly (online)
Irvin Leigh Matus Shakespeare website
Article about Vitagraph Studios

Shakespearean scholars
Shakespeare authorship question
Independent scholars
1941 births
2011 deaths
Writers from Brooklyn
Erasmus Hall High School alumni
Baseball statisticians